Newsjack may refer to:
 Newsjack, a British radio sketch show
 Newsjacking, to gain publicity by "hijacking" a news story
 Newsjacking, to steal newspapers for sale as scrap